Josh Dylan is a British actor. He is best known for his role as Captain Adam Hunter in Allied (2016), as well as Young Bill in Mamma Mia! Here We Go Again (2018).

Career
Josh Dylan trained at the Guildhall School of Music and Drama in London. In 2017, Dylan starred in the Orange Tree Theatre's production of Sheppey, directed by Paul Miller and won the 2017 Off West End Award for Best Supporting Actor.

Filmography

Film

Television

References

External links

 

Living people
People educated at Ardingly College
21st-century English male actors
English male film actors
Year of birth missing (living people)